The Ministry of Textiles is a ministry in the Government of Maharashtra. It is responsible for the promotion of the textile industry in Maharashtra.

The Ministry is headed by a cabinet level minister. Chandrakant Patil is current Minister of Textiles. The Cabinet Minister is assisted by the Minister of State.

Head office

List of Cabinet Ministers

List of Ministers of State

List of Principal Secretary

Textile in Maharashtra
In the second half of the 19th century, a large textile industry grew up in the Mumbai city and surrounding towns, operated by Indian entrepreneurs. Simultaneously a labour movement was organized. Starting with the Factory Act of 1881, the state government played an increasingly important role in regulating the industry. The Bombay presidency set up a factory inspection commission in 1884. There were restrictions on the hours of children and women. An important reformer was Mary Carpenter, who wrote factory laws that exemplified Victorian modernization theory of the modern, regulated factory as vehicle of pedagogy and civilizational uplift. Laws provided for compensation for workplace accidents.

The Great Bombay Textile Strike brought changes in textile industry. It was a textile strike called on 18 January 1982 by the mill workers of Mumbai under trade union leader Dutta Samant. The purpose of the strike was to obtain bonus and increase in wages. The majority of the over 80 textile mills in Central Mumbai closed during and after the strike, leaving more than 150,000 workers unemployed. The textile industry in Mumbai has largely disappeared, reducing labour migration after the strikes.

As one of the consequence of the strike, the textile industries in Mumbai shut down and moved to the periphery or to other states as the land became real estate gold mine. Mumbai's functional nature changed from being industrial to commercial.

Textile parks
Maharashtra government is planning to set up 9 textile parks.

References

External links

Government ministries of Maharashtra
Maharashtra